Agaricus subrutilescens, also known as the wine-colored agaricus, is a mushroom of the genus Agaricus. It was first described scientifically in 1925 as Psalliota subrutilescens, and later transferred to Agaricus in 1938.

Description
The gills are close and white at first, turning pinkish and then dark brown in age. The flesh is white and does not stain, and the odor and taste are mild.

The purplish fibrous cap and shaggy white stem differentiate this mushroom from others which resemble it. Similar species include Agaricus hondensis and Agaricus moelleri.

This mushroom is regarded variously described as edible, inedible, or responsible for causing gastric upset.

Habitat and distribution
The mushroom fruits in undisturbed mixed woods in Western North America and Japan.  It grows by itself or scattered in small clusters, often under redwood, pine, or alder.
Recently this mushroom has been identified in New Zealand and Australia.

See also
 List of Agaricus species

References

subrutilescens
Fungi described in 1925
Fungi of Asia
Fungi of North America